The Pipistrel Velis Electro is a Slovenian light aircraft, designed and produced by Pipistrel of Ajdovščina. The aircraft was EASA CS-LSA fully electric type certified in June 2020 and it is intended primarily for the training aircraft role, particularly multiple successive take-off and landings at the airfield. The design is the first type certified electric aircraft and is supplied complete and ready-to-fly.

Design

The aircraft is based on the Pipistrel Virus airframe and features a cantilever high-wing, a two-seats-in-side-by-side configuration in an enclosed cabin accessed via doors. It has a stick shaker and fixed tricycle landing gear and a single electric motor in tractor configuration.

The airframe is predominantly made from composite materials.

The motor was developed in conjunction with the Slovenian engineering companies Emrax and Emsiso. It is powered by a 345 VDC, 24.8 kWh battery pack, in two  each, liquid-cooled lithium batteries by Pipistrel, connected in parallel for fault tolerance. One battery is mounted in the nose and one behind the cabin for balance. They take 2 hours to recharge from 30% to 100% capacity, and allow an endurance of up to 50 minutes plus 10 minutes of VFR reserves when flying in proximity of the aerodrome. The motor radiator is mounted in the nose, which necessitates a different engine cowling from the Virus design. The battery radiator is mounted in the rear. Due to the liquid cooling and the weight of the battery unit, the batteries are not swappable, unlike the battery replacement system in the Alpha Electro. Take-off is not allowed when battery state of charge (SoC) is below 50%.

The aircraft has a built-in continuous health-monitoring system displaying the estimated 'age' of the battery, and the battery must be charged using proprietary equipment. The E-811 is the first certified electric aircraft motor and was certified by EASA on 18 May 2020.

The Velis Electro has a maximum noise level of 60 dBa.

Development

The design received its European Union Aviation Safety Agency (EASA) type certificate for day, visual flight rules operations, on 10 June 2020, after a certification period of just under three years. The short time frame for the first certification of an electric aircraft was attributed by EASA to "close co-operation" between the manufacturer and the agency. The design was approved as a variant of the Virus on the same type certificate and is officially designated by EASA as the Virus SW 128 (Velis Electro).

The aircraft is in production and the manufacturer has indicated that they intend to deliver 31 examples during 2020. The first one was delivered on 16 July 2020 to a customer in Switzerland. In January 2021, Pipistrel announced an order for 50 Velis Electro from Green Aerolease from France. The aircraft will be leased to French flight schools in cooperation with the FFA. A similar deal was announced in October 2021 by the British company Green Airside, which will acquire 50 Velis Electros for rental to flight schools in the United Kingdom.

Operational history
In August and September 2020, a group of Swiss electric mobility enthusiasts with support from the manufacturer flew a Velis Electro on a series of flights intended to be accepted as world records. Records were claimed for the lowest energy consumption (22.76 kWh/100 km), the highest average speed over a 100 km (136 km/h) and a 700 km (125 km/h) route, longest electrically flown route over 24 hours (327 km), 48 hours (608 km) and 56 hours (839 km).

Accolades
The Pipistrel Velis Electro has received several awards since its introduction. In November 2020, Plane & Pilot Magazine named it the "2020 Plane of the Year". In August 2021, the Velis Electro received the 2021 AIAA Aircraft Design Award. The Velis Electro is one of the winners of the 2021 Aviation Week Network's Laureate Awards in the category Business Aviation.

Military operators

Royal Danish Air Force - two aircraft leased for two years for evaluation

Slovenian Air Force and Air Defence – five aircraft for evaluation

Specifications

See also
 List of current production certified light aircraft
 List of electric aircraft
 Light-sport aircraft
 EASA CS-VLA

References

External links

Official video

Electric aircraft
2010s Slovenian civil utility aircraft
Pipistrel aircraft
Single-engined tractor aircraft
High-wing aircraft